Surge Radio is an English student radio station based at the University of Southampton. Founded in 1976 as Radio Heffalump, the station was renamed Radio Glen the following year and originally broadcast from the university's Glen Eyre Halls complex.

History

Surge Radio began broadcasting in the autumn term of 1976 as a pirate station, before it was agreed in March 1977 to form a legal radio station at Glen Eyre. The station was founded as Radio Glen and initially broadcast from a studio in Glen Eyre "F-Block", transmitting on AM by means of induction-loop systems installed on building rooftops on 963, and later on 1602, KHz.

The early 1980s brought major developments, including the station's first regular service of student news, a consistent programme schedule, the construction of a second studio and new music library, refurbishment of the main studio with cartridge machines and a new student-built mixer, and a sung jingle package. The station relocated to larger premises in New Terrace in 1998.

In 2000 the station began broadcasting on 1287AM, having before only reached Glen Eyre tenants, and in 2001 it commenced FM transmissions for one week per year. Also in 2001, the station was re-branded as SURGE, an acronym of Southampton University Radio from Glen Eyre.

In 2003 the station won its first Student Radio Award, awarded by the UK Student Radio Association: station Webmaster Nicholas Humfrey picked up the Technical Innovation Award for his "Total Request" system, while the website was awarded silver in the Website of the Year category. Surge News was founded in February 2004 by James Laidler, and in 2005 won first place in the SRA News & Talk category, with Nick Bevan picking up Surge's third award, for Newcomer of the Year. In June 2005, Surge successfully received funding of £25,000 from SUSU for construction of a new studio in the Students' Union building on the University's Highfield Campus, which was completed and launched in October. In April 2006 the station hosted the Student Radio Conference, and in June hosted the BBC 6 Music Breakfast Show with Phill Jupitus. Surge picked up an award for Best Entertainment Show in November 2006, when Nick Bevan, Thomas Morgan and Zander Bell won with "The Nick & Mogs Show".

In the 2011 Student Radio Awards Surge's Technical Manager Ben Morton received two nominations for the station, both in the category of Best Technical Achievement; he won the silver award at the ceremony for his work on the Surge Facebook application. Surge celebrated its 40th birthday in 2016.

In February 2017, a rare EMI BTR-3 tape recorder, previously used at Abbey Road Studios in the 1960s, was recovered by members of the Surge committee from the old Glen Eyre Halls studio after information on its whereabouts was provided by former Radio Glen Technical Manager Henry Walmsley, who had used the machine at the premises throughout the 1990s. The BTR-3 was donated to Abbey Road in April 2017, and in exchange, Surge were invited to broadcast from their new 'Front Room' studio. This made Surge the first group to use the Front Room studio, and the first student radio station to ever broadcast from Abbey Road Studios; the broadcast took place on April 13, 2017. 

The station was heavily affected by the COVID-19 pandemic and the ensuing lockdowns; its final broadcast was on the evening of the March 13th, 2020, which coincided with the Southampton Student Film Festival. While the station was originally expected to begin broadcasting again during the 2021-2022 academic year, permanent broadcasting resumed in an online-only format in July 2022. Like many university societies, Surge saw both its membership and funding decrease during the pandemic, however membership has now returned to pre-pandemic levels. Surge Television & Radio are now also run as a single, unitary committee.

Committee 
The Surge Radio committee are in charge of running the station and are elected at the end of each academic year for the following academic year by current members of the station.

Studios 
Surge Radio, along with SURGEtv, operate from two main studios and various facilities through the University of Southampton.

Radio Studio 
The Radio Studio is Surge Radio's live broadcast studio. Studio 1 has four microphones and a mixing desk, and the majority of shows on the schedule take place within Studio 1. Studio 1 is also used for live music sessions.

Podcast Studio 
The Podcast Studio is Surge Radio's podcast studio; it is primarily used as a recording suite for podcasts, news bulletins, station sound and original music.

Student Radio Awards
Surge Radio has been nominated for, and won, many Student Radio Awards since they were launched in 1995.

I Love Student Radio Awards
The I Love Student Radio Awards are a separate awards ceremony held every year at the Student Radio Conference that aim to celebrate and reward the commitment of individuals and teams that work in student radio.

See also
 Student Radio Association
 SUSUtv
 Wessex Scene
 University of Southampton Students' Union
 University of Southampton

References

External links

Surge - University of Southampton at the Student Radio Association.

Radio stations established in 1976
Radio stations in Hampshire
Student radio in the United Kingdom
University of Southampton